Lionel Beylot-Bourcelot (born 28 November 1957) is a French former swimmer. 
He won a bronze medal in the 1975 Mediterranean Games in Al-Jaza'ir (Algiers), Algeria, swimming the 200 m backstroke.
He competed in the men's 100 metre backstroke at the 1976 Summer Olympics.

References

External links
 

1957 births
Living people
French male backstroke swimmers
Olympic swimmers of France
Swimmers at the 1976 Summer Olympics
Place of birth missing (living people)
Mediterranean Games bronze medalists for France
Mediterranean Games medalists in swimming
Swimmers at the 1975 Mediterranean Games
Male backstroke swimmers